The Honourable Anne Poulett (11 July 1711 – 5 July 1785) was a British politician who sat in the House of Commons for sixteen years from 1769 until his death in 1785.

Poulett was the fourth son of John Poulett, 1st Earl Poulett and was born on 11 July 1711. He received his unusual first name in honour of Queen Anne, who was his sponsor at his baptism.

Poulett initially stood for election at Bridgwater in the 1768 general election, and although he was initially declared defeated the result was reversed on petition in 1769. He was returned unopposed in the 1774 general election and headed the poll at contested elections in 1780 and 1784. Throughout his career he was generally a supporter of Lord North, though occasionally voting against him.

In 1780 Poulett presented to St Mary's Church in Bridgwater a magnificent 17th-century painting of The Descent from the Cross, apparently captured when a Spanish warship was taken as a prize. The artist is unknown, although it has been controversially attributed to Murillo. The picture is now used as the altarpiece of the church.

On 2 May 1785, he presented to parliament a petition from his constituents for the abolition of the slave trade, making Bridgwater the first town to submit such a petition. However, it was largely ignored.

Poulett died on 5 July 1785.

References

 
 Lewis Namier & John Brooke, The History of Parliament: The House of Commons 1754–1790 (London: HMSO, 1964)
 Somerset Victoria County History, online at www.british-history.ac.uk

External links
The Poulett painting in St Mary's, Bridgwater

1711 births
1785 deaths
British MPs 1768–1774
British MPs 1774–1780
British MPs 1780–1784
British MPs 1784–1790
Members of the Parliament of Great Britain for English constituencies
Tory members of the Parliament of Great Britain
Younger sons of earls